RPN may refer to:

Mathematics
Reverse Polish notation, a.k.a. postfix notation, a mathematical notation
 real projective space

Nursing
Registered practical nurse, also referred to as a licensed practical nurse
Registered psychiatric nurse

Other uses
Radio Philippines Network, Channel 9, Philippines
 (National Housing Programme), a type of public housing in Brunei
Recherche en Prévision Numérique, a numerical weather prediction research center in Canada
Registered Parameter Number, as used in Musical Instrument Digital Interface synthesizers
Risk Priority Number, as used in failure mode and effects analysis
Rosh Pina Airport (IATA code), Israel